Aurore Bergé (born 13 November 1986) is a French politician who has represented the 10th constituency of the Yvelines department in the National Assembly since 2017. A former member of The Republicans (LR), which she left to join La République En Marche! (LREM) in early 2017, she is considered a close ally of President Emmanuel Macron. Since 2022, she has been leading the party's group in the National Assembly.

Career
A native of Paris, Bergé studied at Sciences Po earning her degree in 2009. In 2002, she joined the Union for a Popular Movement (UMP), which became The Republicans (LR) in 2015. She has been a municipal councillor of Magny-les-Hameaux since the 2014 election. In the party primary ahead of the 2017 presidential election, she campaigned for Alain Juppé.

Bergé joined La République En Marche! in early 2017. She wrote a column published in L'Obs to explain why she switched parties. In the 2017 legislative election, she defeated incumbent Christian Democrat Jean-Frédéric Poisson in the 10th constituency of Yvelines. From 2017 until 2019, Bergé served as one of her parliamentary group's spokespersons under the leadership of its successive group presidents Richard Ferrand and Gilles Le Gendre.

In 2020, Bergé was a candidate to succeed Le Gendre as group president. However, she lost against former Interior Minister Christophe Castaner. Castaner, a former member of the Socialist Party who is associated with the party's left-wing whilst Bergé is associated with its right-wing, appointed her as his deputy (alongside Coralie Dubost), with the title of group president delegate (présidente déléguée). In Parliament, Bergé serves as member of the Committee on Cultural Affairs and Education.

Political positions
In the 2012 Union for a Popular Movement leadership election, Bergé supported François Fillon as the party's leader.

In September 2018, following the appointment of François de Rugy to a ministership, Bergé supported the candidacy of Richard Ferrand for the presidency of the National Assembly.

In August 2020, Bergé was one of the LREM members who endorsed an animal welfare referendum calling a for ban on some hunting practices that are deemed "cruel".

Reproductive rights
In September 2019, alongside Guillaume Chiche, Bergé led a group of LREM members who advocated for a bioethics law extending to homosexual and single women free access to fertility treatments such as in vitro fertilisation (IVF) under France's national health insurance; it was one of the campaign promises of President Emmanuel Macron and marked the first major social reform of his five-year term. 

In October 2020, Bergé was one of 48 LREM members who voted in support of a bill introduced by the Ecology Democracy Solidarity parliamentary group that would extend the legal deadline for abortion from 12 to 14 weeks of pregnancy; at the time of the vote, she took a public stand based on her own experience with abortion.

Hijab
In October 2019, Bergé caused controversy when she announced her intention to vote in favour of a draft law written by Éric Ciotti of The Republicans, which would ban the wearing of the hijab by women accompanying groups of students on school outings; as a response, five other LREM members – Coralie Dubost, Cécile Rilhac, Jean-Michel Mis, Stéphane Trompille and Éric Bothorel – disassociated themselves from her. In February 2022, she went against the party line again and was one of six LREM legislators who supported the Republicans’ motion for a ban on wearing hijabs in sports competitions.

See also
 2017 French legislative election

References

1986 births
Living people
Sciences Po alumni
Deputies of the 15th National Assembly of the French Fifth Republic
Deputies of the 16th National Assembly of the French Fifth Republic
La République En Marche! politicians
21st-century French women politicians
Members of the Regional Council of Île-de-France
Politicians from Paris
Women members of the National Assembly (France)
Abortion-rights activists
Members of Parliament for Yvelines